Michel Hunault (born February 14, 1960 in Châteaubriant) is a French politician.  He was a member of the National Assembly of France, representing Loire-Atlantique's 6th constituency from 1993 to 2012. He was a member of (in order) RPR, UMP, UDF and New Centre.  He followed his father, Xavier Hunault as deputy.  Following the 2010 redistricting of French legislative constituencies, the sixth constituency expanded in area.  He was defeated at the 2012 French legislative election by Yves Daniel of the socialists.

References

1960 births
Living people
People from Châteaubriant
Politicians from Pays de la Loire
Rally for the Republic politicians
Union for a Popular Movement politicians
The Centrists politicians
Union of Democrats and Independents politicians
Deputies of the 10th National Assembly of the French Fifth Republic
Deputies of the 11th National Assembly of the French Fifth Republic
Deputies of the 12th National Assembly of the French Fifth Republic
Deputies of the 13th National Assembly of the French Fifth Republic